Clifton M. Speegle (November 4, 1917 – September 5, 1994) was an American football player, coach, and college athletics administrator.  He served as the head football coach at Oklahoma State University–Stillwater from 1955 to 1962, compiling a record of 36–42–3. During his tenure, Oklahoma State was 0–8 in the Bedlam Series, their rivalry game against the Oklahoma Sooners.  Speegle was fired in 1962.  He played college football at the University of Oklahoma from 1938 to 1940.

Head coaching record

References

External links
 
 
 Cliff Speegle's obituary

1917 births
1994 deaths
American football centers
Chicago Cardinals players
Colgate Raiders football coaches
Edmonton Elks coaches
Oklahoma Sooners football players
Oklahoma State Cowboys football coaches
Toronto Argonauts coaches
UTEP Miners football coaches
Southwest Conference commissioners
People from Kiowa County, Oklahoma